Ralph Therrio (born January 12, 1954) is an American former cyclist. He competed at the 1972 Summer Olympics and 1976 Summer Olympics.

References

External links
 

1954 births
Living people
American male cyclists
Olympic cyclists of the United States
Cyclists at the 1972 Summer Olympics
Cyclists at the 1976 Summer Olympics
Cyclists from Chicago
American track cyclists
Pan American Games medalists in cycling
Pan American Games gold medalists for the United States
Medalists at the 1975 Pan American Games